The 1991–92 Montana Grizzlies basketball team represented the University of Montana during the 1991–92 NCAA Division I basketball season. The Grizzlies were led by former assistant coach and first-year head coach Blaine Taylor and played their home games on campus at Adams Fieldhouse in Missoula, Montana.

They finished the regular season at 25–3, with a  record in conference to win the regular season title. The Grizzlies earned an automatic berth in the NCAA tournament by winning the Big Sky Conference tournament.

In the opening round of the NCAA Tournament at BSU Pavilion in Boise, Idaho, Montana faced the No. 3 seed Florida State. The Grizzlies were beaten in a competitive game, 78–68.

Postseason results

|-
!colspan=9 style=| Big Sky tournament

|-
!colspan=9 style=| NCAA tournament

References

External links
Sports Reference – Montana Grizzlies: 1991–92 basketball season

Montana Grizzlies basketball seasons
Montana
Montana